Netherne-on-the-Hill is a village in Surrey, England, occupying a plateau once home to Netherne Hospital. The post town, Coulsdon in Greater London is centred  due north.

History
Unlike Hooley which was mostly part of Coulsdon manor and parish, the land here was within the traditional boundaries of Merstham as a village, that is within its ecclesiastical parish.  The property called Netherne – 'Lez Nedder' in 1522 – was acquired in the first decade of the 20th century by the Surrey County Council for an asylum; the quit-rent payable yearly for the land of a little over half of one pound sterling recorded in 1522 was enfranchised from the land by the Council paying its owner.

Being on the ridge of the North Downs, the relevant mineral prosperity of the parish was important at the slopes straddling this particular plateau, very sparsely inhabited though it was, and increasingly bereft of water, being aloft of aquifers.  The county history of 1911 states:

20th century psychiatric care

Netherne Hospital opened in 1903 as a pleasant asylum for psychiatric patients. The complex could house up to 2000 patients at its peak and its founders built its own laundry, power station, sewage works, farm and sporting facilities. The hospital was known to be progressive in its treatment of mental illnesses, including in its use of art therapy and psychiatric rehabilitation. It closed in 1994 following the community integration of most of its patients.

The hospital chapel is now home to the new community's swimming pool and gym.  Notwithstanding this history, little remains at all apart from a minority of converted buildings including the iconic main administration building, several ward block, villas, staff houses, the upper lodge ( now a shop) and the water tower. The central area comprising the original administration building, the water tower, two ward blocks, and four smaller detached buildings now form the Netherne on the Hill Conservation area, and are locally listed.

Conversion to residential estate
The former hospital estate was sold by the Department of Health to M J Gleeson in 1995, with development of a new village commencing shortly afterwards. The development was to have included about 440 houses, a nursing home, a business centre, a shop, a public house and recreational open space. The developer Gleeson never built the nursing home, business centre or public house, and sold much of the land to other developers after having to pay for expensive essential works to the road bridge spanning two deep railway cuttings close to the A23 to the west of the village.

Demography
Demography is difficult to quantify precisely for the village.  No designated UK ward had yet been created for Netherne-on-the-Hill in local government in time for the 2011 United Kingdom census.

However the village formed in 2011 approximately half of the Lower Output Area Reigate and Banstead 004E, whose population was 2,698 clustered into divisions of this village and Hooley, altogether covering .  This gave a density which is valid for the settlement approximately, therefore, of 6.3 persons per hectare.    The population if exactly half would be 1,349, which provides an approximation for both.

Amenities
Netherne's amenities mainly comprise a village shop, indoor swimming pool and gym, tennis courts, football and cricket pitches, but the bowls club was knocked down as the building was not safe . A village hall opened in the former recreation hall in 2011, housing parent & baby groups, quiz nights, scouts/brownie, dance classes and parties.  The cricket pavilion has been acquired by the management company of the village and is available for private hire.  Since October 2017 a community cafe runs two days a week.  The village has a website which has details of all the amenities which can be found at www.nmanltd.com. There was a commuter minibus that ran to Coulsdon South station at peak times during the week but this stopped during covid lockdown and has not restarted. The village is set in extensive landscaped grounds totally around 80 acres, in the joint ownership of the home owners in the village.

Religion
The nearest place of worship and present parish within the Church of England is at 13th century St Margaret's, Chipstead, approximately 600 metres west of the village centre, in Hooley.

The Croydon Mosque in Sunni Islam is  NNE and was founded at its current address in 1978, having been established in the early 1960s.

Buddhism has a venue in Croydon named the Croydon Buddhist Centre.

Notes and references
Notes

References

External links

Villages in Surrey